Rajiv Khosla is an Indian-American scientist and professor of precision agriculture. He is best known for his work on measurement and management of in-field soil and crop spatial variability for nutrients.

Biography
Khosla received his B.Sc. in agriculture sciences from the University of Allahabad India in 1992. He received his M.S. in soil physics and his Ph.D. from Virginia Tech in 1992 and 1995, respectively. Since 1999, he has been on the faculty of Colorado State University where he held the Monfort Professorship from 2008-2010.

Khosla is an Honorary Lifetime Fellow of International Society of Precision Agriculture, a selected Jefferson Science Fellow, and a Fellow of the Soil and Water Conservation Society, the American Society of Agronomy, and the Soil Science Society of America. In 2012, he served as Jefferson Science Fellow in the Bureau of East Asia Pacific Affairs at the United States Department of State. In 2015, he was named the Precision Agriculture Educator of the Year.

References

External links

Living people
University of Allahabad alumni
Virginia Tech alumni
Colorado State University faculty
Jefferson Science Fellows
Sam Higginbottom University of Agriculture, Technology and Sciences alumni
Year of birth missing (living people)
American soil scientists